Sufficiency economy is the name of a Thai development approach attributed to the late King Bhumibol Adulyadej's "sufficiency economy philosophy" (SEP). It has been elaborated upon by Thai academics and agencies, promoted by the Government of Thailand, and applied by over 23,000 villages in Thailand that have SEP-based projects in operation.

History
Soon after ascending to the throne in 1946, King Bhumibol toured the country and became aware of the hardships facing Thai farmers. At that time, the per capita GDP was about US$200. He took a keen interest in rural development, and instituted a number of royal projects to help the lot of the rural impoverished.

The sufficiency economy philosophy was elaborated upon in the king's speeches to students at Kasetsart University in 1974 and Khon Kaen University. To the latter he said, "Development of the country must proceed in stages. First of all, there must be a foundation with the majority of the people having enough to live on by using methods and equipment which are economical but technically correct as well. When such a secure foundation is adequately ready and operational, then it can be gradually expanded and developed to raise prosperity and the economic standard to a higher level by stages."

Sufficiency economy came to prominence during the 1997 economic crisis when the king told a nationwide television audience, "Recently, so many projects have been implemented, so many factories have been built, that it was thought Thailand would become a little tiger, and then a big tiger. People were crazy about becoming a tiger...Being a tiger is not important. The important thing for us is to have a sufficient economy. A sufficient economy means to have enough to support ourselves..."

The sufficiency economy
Three interrelated components and two underlying conditions are central to SEP's application. The three components are reasonableness (or wisdom), moderation, and prudence. Two essential underlying conditions are knowledge and morality. In contrast to the concept that the primary duty of a company is to maximize profits for the benefit of shareholders, SEP emphasizes maximizing the interests of all stakeholders and having a greater focus on long-term profitability as opposed to short-term success.

The Chaipattana Foundation says sufficiency economy is "...a method of development based on moderation, prudence, and social immunity, one that uses knowledge and virtue as guidelines in living."

A chapter entitled "Buddhist Economics" in  E.F. Schumacher's 1973 book, Small Is Beautiful provides much of the intellectual underpinning of King Bhumibol's sufficiency economy theories. The king was moved to translate it—it is not clear if he translated only the chapter or the book in its entirety—into the Thai language. Schumacher was a Christian whose thinking was influenced by what he observed in Burma and India.
   
Sufficiency economy is not a theory about how the economy of a country works, but rather a guide for making decisions that will produce outcomes that are beneficial to development. According to Thailand's National Economic and Social Development Board: 

The Oxford Business Group's 2016 report on Thailand says "the sufficiency economy concept puts sustainability at its very core" and "is now seen as an important contributor to the UN's international development goals...advancing a different approach from short-term shareholder value-centred ideas of economic development."

Self-sufficiency economics promotes the idea of limited production in order to protect the environment and conserve scarce resources. Production should be aimed at individual consumption. Production in excess of consumption may be sold. The philosophy holds that the rich can consume as many resources as they like so long as their consumption does not incur debt, and that the poor should consume resources without borrowing.

Translating philosophy into action 
The Thai governmental organisation most responsible for implementing the sufficiency economy is the National Economic and Social Development Board (NESDB). The NESDB's primary tool for mobilising action is the publication of the National Economic and Development Plan. The latest (twelfth) version of this plan covers the years 2017-2021.

After the 2006 coup d'état, the military junta claimed that the policies of deposed Prime Minister Thaksin Shinawatra were inconsistent with the king's philosophy. The preamble of the junta's new constitution stated that promotion of self-sufficiency was one of the fundamental roles of the state.

The junta-appointed Prime Minister, Surayud Chulanont, pledged to allocate 10 billion baht (US$300 million) for projects to promote well-being in line with King Bhumibol's sufficiency economy principle. He made the pledge while participating in King Bhumibol's 80th birthday celebrations.

Pit thong lang phra
Pit thong lang phra is a Thai idiom meaning "to eschew praise for one's good deeds". It is the name of a royal initiative to foster rural development using the philosophy of the sufficiency economy. Founded in 2008, the project is in its second phase, from 2016 to 2020. It was first deployed for five years in Nan, Udon Thani, Phetchaburi, Uthai Thani, and Kalasin Provinces. It enabled farmers in 2,017 families to earn 285 million baht in income. The second phase of the project will aim at assisting farmers in Khon Kaen's Ubolratana District and 21 villages in Yala, Pattani, and Narathiwat Provinces. It will be funded with 1.5 billion baht from the Office of the Prime Minister, focusing the efforts of four state agencies.

Critiques 
According to an opinion expressed in a leaked unclassified, yet sensitive, message from the US Embassy in Bangkok to the US State Department, the tenets of sufficiency economy are described as "vague and malleable", and its popularity is due to a "...public reluctance to criticize anything associated with the revered King." And—as one economist put it—"Who can oppose a model that promotes 'reasonableness', 'good behavior', and 'protection from shocks'?"

Many economists were, for the most part, left confused by the meaning of sufficiency economy. After a meeting with Thai Ministry of Finance officials where the need for more sufficiency was lauded, Standard & Poor's director of sovereign ratings admitted that, "No one knows what [sufficiency economy] really means." The Asia Times'' noted that "There is a concurrent risk that the royal philosophy will be twisted by less scrupulous government officials as an opportunity to abuse their authority for rent-seeking and extortion, particularly among foreign-invested concerns". NGO activists who embraced the king's sufficiency economy theory to oppose the construction of large-scale dams were rebuffed by Bhumibol, a long-time advocate of dam construction, who claimed that the deforestation caused by dams was a necessary evil to provide consistent energy and water sources for farmers.

There have been efforts by the military government to incorporate the king's sufficiency economy in national economic policy. Thai critics are generally careful to direct their criticisms towards the military rather than the king, out of fear of prosecution for lèse majesté. Consequently, criticisms are most often targeted at ineffective application rather than disagreement in principle. Nonetheless, common points of disagreement include:
 
The philosophy is not consistent with the realities of Thailand's economic development.
Nobody understands what "sufficiency economy" really means and there are several vague interpretations. 

Professor Kevin Hewison, Director of the Carolina Asia Center at the University of North Carolina, is critical of sufficiency economy. He has written that, "Sufficiency Economy is essentially about keeping the poor in their place. The people and organisations that promote SE are a wonderfully contradictory lot. The king, promoting moderation, sits at the head of a family and institutional wealth that is huge, based on land ownership and large capitalist corporations. The Crown Property Bureau's known institutional wealth is estimated more than US$40 billion.... Prime Minister Surayud spends considerable time talking up SE and his government has made huge budget allocations to SE activities. Meanwhile, Surayud has declared collections of luxury cars and watches and expensive homes, despite having been on a relatively low military salary his entire career. The contradictions are massive. For the wealthy, SE means that they can enjoy their wealth so long as they do so within their means. For the poor, the advice is to make do. In class terms, SE becomes an ideology to justify inequalities.

See also
 Chaipattana Foundation
 Doi Kham
 Middle Way
 Moderately prosperous society
 Royal Project Foundation
 Royal Rainmaking Project
 Sustainable living

References

Further reading

External links 
 Sufficiency Economy Philosophy for Sustainable Development Goals
 An Application of Sufficiency Economy in the Health Sector in Thailand

Economy of Thailand
Localism (politics)
Economic ideologies